M80 Radio is a radio station in Portugal (and formerly also Spain) playing music from the 1970s, 1980s, 1990s and 2000s.

In Spain, the station began the emission on January 18, 1993 as Radio 80 Serie Oro. In 1994, the name was changed to M80. On November 21, 2018 at 6:40 CEST, M80 Radio finalized emissions in the country, and was replaced by LOS40 Classic.

In Portugal, it started broadcasting in 2007, and is still active as of January 3, 2020. The station is owned by Bauer Media Group.

Frequencies in Portugal:
M80 Rádio:

Lisboa 104.3
Porto/Matosinhos 90.0 FM 
Coimbra 98.4 FM
Santarém 96.4 FM
Braga/Fafe 103.8 FM
Beja 106.4 FM
Évora 106.4
Faro 106.1 FM
Leiria 93.0 FM
Viseu/Penalva do Castelo 95.6 FM
Portalegre 106.7 FM
Portimão 107.1 FM
Santiago do Cacém 107.5 FM
Setúbal 104.3 FM
Vila Real 97.4 FM
Aveiro 94.4 FM

External links
M80 Radio Portugal

Radio stations in Portugal
PRISA
Radio stations established in 1993
Defunct radio stations in Spain